A Date with the Everly Brothers is the fourth studio album by American singing duo the Everly Brothers, released in 1960. It peaked at No. 9 on the Billboard Pop albums charts and reached No. 3 in the UK.

The song "Love Hurts" appears here for the first time. It would subsequently be covered by numerous other artists. Other than the "Cathy's Clown"/"Always It's You" single, all of the tracks on A Date with the Everly Brothers were recorded in just four sessions during July 1960.

Legacy

Writing for Allmusic, critic Richie Unterberger wrote of the album "Although the material is not on the killer level of 'It's Everly Time', there are some very fine songs on their second Warner LP."

The album was included in Robert Dimery's 1001 Albums You Must Hear Before You Die.

Track listing

Personnel
Don Everly – guitar, vocals
Phil Everly – guitar, vocals

References

The Everly Brothers albums
1961 albums
Warner Records albums